Josiah Lamborn (January 31, 1809 – March 31, 1847) was the Attorney General of Illinois from 1840 to 1843 and was the chief prosecuting attorney in the trial of five defendants accused of murdering Latter Day Saint leaders Joseph Smith Jr. and Hyrum Smith.

Lamborn was born in Pennsylvania and educated at Transylvania University in Kentucky. In the early 1830s, he moved to Jacksonville, Morgan County, Illinois, where he became involved as a leader of the anti-Jacksonian wing of the Democratic Party.

Lamborn was admitted to the Illinois bar in 1834. Early in his career, the Illinois Supreme Court found his professional conduct to be "highly censurable", but chose not to disbar or otherwise discipline him.

In December 1840, Lamborn was elected Attorney General of Illinois. As Attorney General, he appeared argued before the state supreme court in 46 cases. During his tenure, it was rumored that Lamborn was corrupt and that he had accepted bribes. Lamborn failed to win the endorsement of the Democratic Party for reelection and his term ended in January 1843, when he was succeeded by James A. McDougall.

In 1844, Lamborn was appointed by Illinois Governor Thomas Ford as the chief prosecutor in the murder trial of Levi Williams, Thomas C. Sharp, Jacob C. Davis, Mark Aldrich, and William N. Grover. The five defendants were accused of conspiring to assassinate Mormon prophet Joseph Smith Jr. and his brother Hyrum Smith. The defendants were acquitted of these charges.

After his failure to gain re-election as Attorney General, Lamborn had begun to drink heavily. He died of delirium tremens at White Hall, Greene County, Illinois.

Notes

1809 births
1847 deaths
Alcohol-related deaths in Illinois
Illinois Attorneys General
Illinois Democrats
Illinois lawyers
Politicians from Jacksonville, Illinois
Transylvania University alumni
19th-century American lawyers